Rollo & King was a Danish group, formed by Søren Poppe and Stefan Nielsen, who represented Denmark in the Eurovision Song Contest 2001. The two men named themselves after two dog names. They topped the charts with their first album Midt i en løbetid which stayed in the charts for 13 weeks in 2000–2001.

Before Søren Poppe got famous with the band, he was a teacher in a school in Valby, in Copenhagen teaching music and mathematics.

Eurovision
Danmarks Radio invited them to enter the Dansk Melodi Grand Prix in 2001. They won with their song Der står et billede af dig på mit bord (literal translation, "There's a picture of you on my desk"). Together with female singer, Signe Svendsen, who had joined the group, they performed the song (translated into English as "Never Ever Let You Go") at the Eurovision Song Contest 2001 and received 177 points ranked second out of 23 entries.

Discography

Albums

Singles

References

Eurovision Song Contest entrants for Denmark
Eurovision Song Contest entrants of 2001
Danish musical groups